The Women's 20 Kilometres Walk event at the 2015 Southeast Asian Games was held at East Coast Park, Singapore on 6 June 2015.

Schedule
All times are Singapore Standard Time (UTC+08:00)

Records

Results

References

Final results

Athletics at the 2015 Southeast Asian Games
Women's sports competitions in Singapore
2015 in women's athletics